Shmuel Onn (Hebrew: שמואל און; born 1960) is a mathematician, Professor of Operations Research and Dresner Chair at the Technion - Israel Institute of Technology. He is known for his contributions to integer programming and nonlinear combinatorial optimization.

Education 
Shmuel Onn did his elementary education in Kadoorie(he). He received his B.Sc. (Cum Laude) in Electrical Engineering from Technion in 1980, and following his obligatory service in the Navy, received his M.Sc. from Technion in 1987. Onn obtained his Ph.D. in operations research from Cornell University, with minors in applied mathematics and computer science, in 1992. His thesis, "Discrete Geometry, Group Representations and Combinatorial Optimization: an Interplay", was advised by Louis J. Billera, Bernd Sturmfels, and Leslie E. Trotter Jr.

During 1992–1993 he was a postdoctoral fellow at DIMACS, and during 1993-1994 he was an Alexander von Humboldt postdoctoral fellow at the University of Passau, Germany.

Career 
In 1994 Onn joined the Faculty of Data and Decision Sciences of Technion, where he is currently Professor and Dresner Chair. He was also a Visiting Professor and Nachdiplom Lecturer at the Institute for Mathematical Research, ETH Zürich in 2009, and Visiting Professor at the Mathematics Department in the University of California at Davis (2001-2002). Professor Onn has been also a long-term visitor at various mathematical research institutes including Mittag-Leffler in Stockholm, MSRI in Berkeley, and Oberwolfach in Germany.
He also served as Associate Editor for Mathematics of Operations Research in 2010–2016 and Associate Editor for Discrete Optimization in 2004–2010.

Onn advised several students and postdoctoral researchers who proceeded to pursue academic careers, including Antoine Deza, Sharon Aviran, Tal Raviv, Nir Halman, and Martin Koutecký.

Research  
Shmuel Onn is known for his contributions to integer programming and nonlinear combinatorial optimization. In particular, he developed an algorithmic theory of linear and nonlinear integer programming in variable dimension using Graver bases. This work introduced the theory of block-structured and n-fold integer programming, and the broader theory of sparse and bounded tree-depth integer programming, shown to be fixed-parameter tractable.
These theories were followed up by other authors, and have applications in a variety of areas.

Some other contributions of Onn include a framework that uses edge-directions for solving
convex multi-criteria combinatorial optimization problems and its applications, a universality theorem showing that every integer program is one over slim three-dimensional tables, the settling of the complexity of hypergraph degree sequences,
and the introduction of colorful linear programming.

Honors and awards  
 2010, INFORMS Computing Society (ICS) Prize.
 2009, Nachdiplom Lecturer, Institute for Mathematical Research, ETH Zürich.

Books 
 Nonlinear discrete optimization: An algorithmic theory. Zurich Lectures in Advanced Mathematics. European Mathematical Society (EMS), Zürich, 2010.

Personal life 
Shmuel is married to Ruth. They have two children, Amos and Naomi, and live in Haifa.

External links
 Shmuel Onn (personal page), Technion
 Shmuel Onn, Technion
 Video Lecture Series on Nonlinear Discrete Optimization at MSRI, Berkeley

References 

Israeli mathematicians
Academic staff of Technion – Israel Institute of Technology
Cornell University alumni

1960 births
Living people